Bard Peak is a  mountain summit located in the Kenai Mountains,  in the U.S. state of Alaska. Although modest in elevation, relief is significant since the eastern aspect of the mountain rises up from the western sea-level arms of Prince William Sound. Bard Peak is often seen and photographed with Shakespeare Shoulder, a  sub-summit, because they are in the background behind Portage Lake, a popular tourist and recreation destination.

The mountain's name was officially adopted in 1969 by the United States Geological Survey, although it was misspelled Baird on their map. The peak's name honors bards Robert Burns, The Bard of Ayrshire, and William Shakespeare, known as The Bard of Avon, (or in England, simply The Bard).

Climate

Based on the Köppen climate classification, Bard Peak is located in a subarctic climate zone with long, cold, snowy winters, and mild summers. Temperatures can drop below −20 °C with wind chill factors below −30 °C. This climate supports the Shakespeare Glacier on the northern slopes of the mountain, the Burns Glacier on the south side, Portage Glacier to the west, and the massive Whittier Glacier (named for John Greenleaf Whittier) on its eastern aspect. May and June are the best months for climbing in terms of favorable weather.

See also

List of mountain peaks of Alaska
Geography of Alaska

References

Gallery

External links
 Bard Peak: weather

Mountains of Alaska
Kenai Mountains-Turnagain Arm National Heritage Area
North American 1000 m summits